The 1988 PBA All-Filipino Conference Finals was the best-of-5 series basketball championship of the 1988 PBA All-Filipino Conference, and the conclusion of the conference's playoffs. The Añejo Rum 65ers and Purefoods Hotdogs played for the 40th championship contested by the league.

The Añejo Rum 65ers won the All-Filipino Conference title with a 3–1 series victory over Purefoods Hotdogs, for their 2nd PBA championship, the Rum Masters became the fifth team to win the All-Filipino crown.

Qualification

Series scoring summary

Games summary

Game 1

Joey Loyzaga fired five three-point shots, all of them on crucial occasions, quelling as many Hotdogs uprising. In the fourth quarter, the Rum Masters got a big scare when the Hotdogs came within two, 97–99, behind Alvin Patrimonio, who scored 34 points, and Jerry Codinera, who showed muscle off the boards, but Joey Loyzaga quickly answered with a triple off a screen by brother Chito, that ignited another Añejo blitz and resulted to a 106–99 advantage.

Game 2

Purefoods surprised everyone by benching Ramon Fernandez for the entire game. Purefoods coach Cris Calilan said there was an order from "higher ups" not to use Fernandez in Game two, the order came 30 minutes before the game. Company President Rene Buhain refused to comment on the benching of Fernandez but confirmed there was indeed such a directive. The Hotdogs started to pull away from a 98-all deadlock and the Rum Masters, who had six triples in the game, were silenced in the last seven minutes, Romulo Mamaril sank two free throws to close the gap at 111–108, but the Hotdogs' reserves Totoy Marquez and Willie Generalao retaliated to clinch the win for Purefoods.

Game 3

Ramon Fernandez watch helplessly at unexplained management decision to keep him on the bench, as Añejo moved within a game of winning the All-Filipino championship, Robert Jaworski's two pressure-laden charities and Hotdogs' Totoy Marquez missed on his last attempt allowed the Rum Masters to escape with a two-point victory. Purefoods raced to a leads of 25–9 and 34–19 early, and it took a full second quarter for Añejo to level the count at 59-all in the first 24 minutes of play. The Rum Masters opened the third period with an 8–2 run for a 67–61 lead, a 15–7 blast by Añejo put them on top, 107–105, with 2:09 left, two more deadlocks ensued before Robert Jaworski provided the marginal free throws, 112–109, 15 seconds remaining.

Game 4

In a come-from-behind overtime victory, an ailing Dondon Ampalayo jumped from a six-hour dextrose detention to inject determination into Anejo's title surge while playing coach Jaworski provided the leadership including a follow up of his own miss to send the game into extension, 119–119. The fouling out of Glenn Capacio and Willie Generalao compounded the woes of Purefoods during the overtime period. Joey Loyzaga's semi-hook shot with their shot clock winding down gave them a three-point edge at 125–122. On a return play after a Purefoods timeout, Romulo Mamaril block Alvin Patrimonio's attempt that started a series of errors for Purefoods with less than a minute to go in the extra period, Jaworski's two free throws with 45 seconds remaining gave the Rum Masters a six-point lead, 128–122.

The Hotdogs opened fire in the third quarter, leading by as much as 19 points at 76–57, but the Rum Masters slowly clawed back and were down by six, 86–92, going into the final period. Añejo grabbed the upper hand at 95–94 on Mamaril's bank shot, the Hotdogs maintain their composure and led 114–107, with 2:26 remaining in regulation, and then came a 12–5 Añejo spurt, starting with Dondon Ampalayo nailing a three-pointer.

Ramon Fernandez, who was vanish for the whole series by the Purefoods management, walked inside the arena midway in the second quarter and seated to watch his former teammates.

Rosters

Broadcast notes

References

1988
1988 PBA season
Barangay Ginebra San Miguel games
Magnolia Hotshots games
Manila Clasico
PBA All-Filipino Conference Finals